Jan Kudlička (born 29 April 1988) is a former Czech pole vaulter. He finished in 8th place at the 2012 Summer Olympics in London with a jump of 5.65 metres.

Competition record

External links
 

1988 births
Living people
Czech male pole vaulters
Olympic athletes of the Czech Republic
Athletes (track and field) at the 2008 Summer Olympics
Athletes (track and field) at the 2012 Summer Olympics
Athletes (track and field) at the 2016 Summer Olympics
Sportspeople from Opava
World Athletics Championships athletes for the Czech Republic
European Athletics Championships medalists
Czech Athletics Championships winners
21st-century Czech people